Gavin Thornbury (born 19 October 1993) is an Irish rugby union player who plays as a lock for Connacht in the Pro14.

Leinster and move to New Zealand
Having completed three years in the Leinster Academy upon leaving Blackrock College, Thornbury earned a professional development contract for the 2015–16 season. However, Thornbury left Leinster to spend six months in New Zealand, where he played for club side Border on the North Island and helped them to victory in the Wanganui premier club competition. This earned Thornbury a call-up to Wanganui provincial representative team, who play in the Heartland Championship - the tier below New Zealand's Mitre 10 Cup and, in October 2016, Thornbury helped Wanganui win the Meads Cup.

Return to Ireland with Connacht
Thornbury returned to Ireland and joined western province and then-defending Pro14 champions Connacht on a two-year contract in April 2017. Following a strong season in the Championship, Thornbury was named to the 2020–21 Pro14 Dream Team.

References

External links
Connacht Profile
Ireland U20 Profile

1993 births
Living people
Irish rugby union players
People educated at Blackrock College
Rugby union players from Dublin (city)
University College Dublin R.F.C. players
Connacht Rugby players
Wanganui rugby union players
Rugby union locks
Leinster Rugby players
Irish expatriate rugby union players
Irish expatriate sportspeople in New Zealand